Kaaraiththoor is a small town in Sri Lanka. It is located within Northern Province.

See also
List of towns in Northern Province, Sri Lanka

References

External links

Populated places in Northern Province, Sri Lanka